Luis Moses Gomez (c. 1660–1740 ) was a Spanish-Sephardic Jewish merchant and trader, whose Spanish Jewish ancestors fled to France and England to escape from the Spanish Inquisition for the New World. 

Gomez came to New York in 1703. In 1705 he was granted an Act of Denization from Queen Anne of England. This certificate gave him rights to conduct business, own property, and live freely within the Colonies without an oath of allegiance to the Church of England. Gomez established himself as a prominent businessman and leader within the early Jewish community in New York and in 1714 he purchased  in Marlboro on the west side of the Hudson River in the then-British colony of New York. There he built a single-story fieldstone block house now called the Gomez Mill House. For some thirty years he and his sons lived there and ran a profitable fur trading post.

His house on the Hudson Highlands where several Indian trails converged served as a frontier trading post for the new colonists. Other pioneers, fleeing tyranny, and the cruelties in Europe for the promise of a new life, then settled in the Hudson Valley. His house has been continuously inhabited for more than 280 years, and it is the earliest known surviving Jewish residence in the country and the oldest home in Orange County listed on the National Register of Historic Places. 

In 1727 he led the drive to finance and construct the Mill Street Synagogue in lower Manhattan, the first Synagogue of Shearith Israel, America's oldest Jewish congregation, and in 1728 he served as its first Parnas (president (Hebrew.))

See also
Gomez Mill House
Jewish history in Colonial America

References

External links
Gomez Foundation website

1660 births
1740 deaths
Jewish-American history
Colonial American merchants
American Sephardic Jews
American people of Spanish-Jewish descent
People from Orange County, New York
People of the Province of New York